Elry Enio Bezerra da Silva (born 26 June 1991), known as Da Silva, is a Brazilian footballer who plays for Barbalha as a midfielder.

Career statistics

References

External links

1991 births
Living people
Brazilian footballers
Association football midfielders
Campeonato Brasileiro Série B players
Campeonato Brasileiro Série C players
Clube Atlético Sorocaba players
Associação Desportiva Recreativa e Cultural Icasa players